Chamaelimnas is a Neotropical metalmark butterfly genus.

Species
Listed alphabetically:
Chamaelimnas ammon (Cramer, 1777)
Chamaelimnas briola Bates, 1868 present in Costa Rica, Colombia, French Guiana, Ecuador, Brazil, Paraguay, Argentina and Peru
Chamaelimnas cercides Hewitson, 1871 present in Venezuela
Chamaelimnas cydonia Stichel, 1910 present in Panama and Colombia
Chamaelimnas joviana Schaus, 1902 present in Bolivia, Argentina and Peru
Chamaelimnas splendens Grose-Smith, 1902 present in Bolivia
Chamaelimnas tircis C. & R. Felder, [1865] present in Bolivia, Brazil and Peru

Sources 
Chamaelimnas at Markku Savela's website on Lepidoptera
TOL images

References

External links
images representing Chamaelimnas at Encyclopedia of Life
images representing Chamaelimnas at Consortium for the Barcode of Life

Riodinini
Riodinidae of South America
Butterfly genera
Taxa named by Baron Cajetan von Felder
Taxa named by Rudolf Felder